The Fond du Lac River is one of the upper branches of the Mackenzie River system, draining into the Arctic Ocean, located in northern Saskatchewan, Canada.

Hydrology
It continues over the Hawkrock Rapids and the North Rapids and takes in the Perch River from the right.

Several tributaries enter at Black Lake: from the right, the Chipman River and the Souter River; and from the left, the Cree River.

The river leaves the lake on the northwest side near the community of Black Lake, travels over the Elizabeth Falls and the Woodcock Rapids, flows past the community of Stony Rapids, and reaches its mouth at Lake Athabasca.

Fish species
The river also supports a number of fish species. These include walleye, yellow perch, northern pike, lake trout, Arctic grayling, lake whitefish, cisco, white sucker, longnose sucker and burbot.

See also
List of rivers of Saskatchewan

References

External links 

Rivers of Saskatchewan
Lake Athabasca